The cast of the television series MythBusters perform experiments to verify or debunk urban legends, old wives' tales, and the like. This is a list of the various myths tested on the show, as well as the results of the experiments (the myth is Busted, Plausible, or Confirmed).

Episode overview

Episode SP2 – "Buster Special" 
 Original air date: February 2, 2005

In this episode, Adam and Jamie relived Buster's finest moments, from his introduction in Exploding Toilet to his ultimate demise (supposedly in Ming Dynasty Astronaut) and showed the construction of the new "Buster 2.0".  These moments include:

 Exploding Toilet
 Barrel of Bricks
 Hammer Bridge Drop
 Raccoon Rocket
 The Mad Trombonist
 Forest Fire Scuba Diver
 Elevator of Death
 Boom-Lift Catapult
 Plywood Builder
 Ming Dynasty Astronaut

Episode SP3 – "Ultimate MythBusters" 
 Original air date: February 9, 2005

In this episode, Adam and Jamie competed in a series of arguably ludicrous tests and competitions to determine which of the two was the "Ultimate MythBuster".  These competitions tested their ingenuity, constitution, and courage to see just how far they were willing to go to claim the title of "Ultimate MythBuster".

Episode 25 – "Brown Note" 
 Original air date: February 16, 2005

Blown Away 
Someone who is shot and thrown backward a significant distance is a staple Hollywood visual effect. This was revisited in "MythBusters Revisited".

Brown Note

Chinese Water Torture

Episode 26 – "Salsa Escape" 
 Original air date: February 23, 2005

Salsa Escape

Cement Mix-Up 
Initially the team only intended to test the scenario of explosives being used to clean a relatively thin layer of concrete from the inside of a truck. Due to a mishap when the truck was being collected, however, it was filled almost to the top with concrete, rather than just with the thin layer that the team wanted. Adam therefore suggested splitting this myth into two sub-myths, the original one of cleaning a thin layer out of a truck (for which the team had to obtain a second truck), and another one involving a driver using explosives in what would presumably be a desperate attempt to remove a massive, solidified slab of concrete from the truck.

Episode 27 – "Exploding Port-a-Potty" 
 Original air date: March 2, 2005

Exploding Port-a-Potty 

See also Exploding Toilet.

Driveshaft Pole Vault

Episode 28 – "Is Yawning Contagious?" 
 Original air date: March 9, 2005

This was the final episode in which the Build Team worked from their M6 workshop.

Toy Car Race

Is Yawning Contagious?

Toast – Butter Side Up or Down?

Episode SP4 – "MythBusters Outtakes" 
 Original air date: March 16, 2005

In this episode, outtakes and other deleted scenes were shown, which included some failed experiments or extra experiments that had to be trimmed out of the show for time and relevancy reasons.  Clips edited out of shows previously aired include:

 "Breakstep Bridge revisit", the short revisit of the original myth. The revisit originally aired on Myths Revisited, but was cut from the US version.
 "Ping-Pong Salvage", in which a sea otter managed to interfere with the experiment by stealing a ping-pong ball from the Mythtanic II.
 "Plywood Builder", where Jamie had trouble with working with the zip line and Christine flat out refused to do the zip line.
 "Chinese Water Torture", where Tory and Scottie each had a turn on the torture rack—Scottie with a blindfold and head restraint, and Tory with a head restraint, shackles, and a stream of iced water.  In the aired version of this myth, Kari and Adam go 'under the drip', and it is found that Chinese water torture is extremely effective—Adam completes his turn without incident (but was not restrained in any way), while Kari, who was restrained, requested that her turn be cut short when she began to suffer an emotional breakdown.
 "Buried Alive", where Adam and a producer each tried the experiment, neither was able to match Jamie's time in the coffin.
 "Cement Mix-Up", where Tory tried to remove concrete from Twister I with a jackhammer, and only barely filled the bottom of the bucket after an hour of work.
 "Needle in a Haystack", where Adam, before settling on the Needlefinder 2000, considered using a sieve, a metal detector, and a bloodhound to find the needles.
 "Escape From Alcatraz", where the MythBusters theorized that the escapees used the tides to go to a different location. The makeshift raft crafted and crewed by the MythBusters team successfully made it across the bay and made it to the Marin Headlands. They declared it "Plausible" because the fate of the prisoners remains unknown. A portion of the scale tests (cut for time but later shown here) also shows that belongings of the prisoners' found in the bay afterwards could have been released by the prisoners and washed up where they were found through strategic use of the Bay's tides to throw the authorities off their trail. Adam and Jamie explored the idea that the escape raft washed ashore on Angel Island after making it to the Marin Headlands as a way to throw the FBI off the convicts' trail. Using a scale model of the San Francisco Bay area, the tide could have washed the raft onto Angel Island if released from the Marin Headlands, but as with their theory of the how the escape could have succeeded, no concrete evidence existed to prove or disprove the theory.
 "Carried Away", in which the Build Team used a pressure chamber to determine the height above sea level at which party balloons would pop.
 "Eelskin Wallet", in which Adam and Jamie tested neodymium magnets to see whether they had the desired effect. The data were successfully erased in just one swipe. This segment was left out due to them not being able to properly assess the power of the magnets. The magnetometer used in testing the strengths of the other items ceased functioning when a neodymium magnet was held near it.
 "Bug Bomb", in which Adam and Jamie tested whether sawdust, flour, straw, or fake smoke could have also caused an explosion if a spark was nearby. None of the materials tested could fully ignite, though sawdust and flour did burn slightly, and reports of flour and saw mill explosions have been confirmed.
 "Elevator of Death", in which the elevator expert answered questions on whether pressing elevator buttons can make the elevator move faster, whether someone can be decapitated by a closing elevator door, and whether zero gravity can be attained by jumping in an elevator. All three questions were answered in the negative.

Six of the deleted segments, titled as the "Lost Experiments", are available on the Discovery Channel website. 

Original myths that were completely edited out include:

Episode 29 – "Cooling a Six-Pack" 
 Original air date: March 23, 2005

From this episode, the Build Team operates from their new M7 workshop.

Also featured in this episode is the first test of Buster 2.0, built during the Buster special, as well as the final test of "Earl the MythBusters Caddy," which was dropped from a crane to fulfil a promise to its previous owner that it would be destroyed on the show.

While preparing Earl to be dropped from the crane, Scottie encountered a problem in that the rear windows needed to be opened to loop a chain through the passenger compartment, but the mechanism was jammed. She therefore took the chance to test out a mini-myth:

Cooling a Six-Pack 

Reference: 
}}

Baghdad Battery 
The Build Team created several copies of the Baghdad Battery, an archaeological find which seems to suggest that ancient Babylonians were the first to use batteries.

The ancient people of Babylon created a crude battery for use in...

Episode 30 – "Son of a Gun" 
 Original air date: March 30, 2005

This episode marks the final appearance of Mythtern Christine Chamberlain.

Son of a Gun

Phone in a Thunderstorm

Trailer Troubles

Episode SP5 – "Shop 'til You Drop" 
 Original air date: April 6, 2005

This episode explored some of the MythBusters' favorite stores and vendors they use when buying supplies for the show.  The episode also included a tutorial on how to make ballistics gel by Adam and Kari (which is frequently used in the MythBusters' experiments), and revealed the source of the often referenced "Little Black Book", the Pocket Ref.

Episode SP6 – "MythBusters Revealed" 
 Original air date: April 27, 2005

This episode took a behind-the-scenes look at the show.  It featured insights from and interviews with Adam, Jamie, Kari, Tory and producer Peter Rees, about various aspects of MythBusters, as well as explored personal issues between the hosts.

Episode SP7 – "Hollywood on Trial" 
 Original air date: May 11, 2005

The MythBusters test some of the pervasive myths that are created by Hollywood, as well as recall some of their past Hollywood-inspired myths.  This special also marks the debut of Grant Imahara as the third member of the Build Team, though the next two regular episodes ("Breaking Glass" and "Jet Pack") did show Scottie Chapman in that capacity instead.

Episode 31 – "Breaking Glass" 
 Original air date: May 18, 2005

Breaking Glass 
Adam and Jamie investigate whether a human voice could shatter glass, as perpetuated in stories of opera singers and demonstrated by Ella Fitzgerald in a commercial for Memorex and Jim Gillette in the music video for Nitro's Freight Train.

Rolling Stone Gathers No Moss 
The Build Team takes on another old adage, and sees if it remains relevant in modern use. This became the longest MythBusters experiment on record—over six months long.

Jet Engine Vacuum

Episode 32 – "Jet Pack" 
 Original air date: June 9, 2005

This episode marks the final appearance of Scottie Chapman as a Build Team member.

Jet Pack

Pyramid Power

Episode 33 – "Killer Brace Position" 
 Original air date: June 22, 2005

Killer Brace Position 
The MythBusters take on an airline conspiracy theory.  The episode is notable for the introduction of the simulaid family.

Cell Phones vs. Drunk Driving 
Adam and Kari take on a contemporary issue in driving, one that has given conflicting scientific data.  To do so, Adam and Kari perform a general-purpose road safety test three times (initially sober without a cellphone, then while talking to Jamie on a cell phone, and finally while slightly intoxicated but under the legal blood alcohol content limit of 0.08%) and compare the three results.

Episode 34 – "Bulletproof Water" 
 Original air date: July 13, 2005

Bulletproof Water 
The MythBusters take on a Hollywood action staple, where a hero dives into water to avoid being hit by bullets. An alternate scenario of this myth was retested in "Guns Fired Underwater".

360° Swing Set

Episode SP8 – "Jaws Special" 
 Original air date: July 17, 2005
As part of Discovery Channel's Shark Week (which Adam and Jamie hosted in 2005), the MythBusters test myths relating to the movie Jaws with the help of a "ShaRammer" designed to simulate the force of a great white shark. This is also the first MythBusters special to run for two hours rather than one. More recent reruns have tended to show a version edited down to one hour. The episode was also referred to as the "Shark Special" in the 22,000 Foot Fall episode.

The sequel, Shark Week Special 2 aired in 2008.

Exploding Scuba Tank

Shark Strength

Barrel Pull Down

Boat Pull

Shark Punching

Mini Myths 
The mini shark myths, while related to Discovery Channel's Shark Week, are not related to the movie Jaws in particular. These are all included on the Jaws Special DVD, and some were included on Discovery's website.

Sharks Prefer Yellow? 
It is also referred to as "Seeing Red."

Drop in the Ocean 
It is also referred to as "Bloody Taste Test" and "Drop of Blood in an Olympic-size Pool."

Shark Skin = Sandpaper? 
It is also referred to as "True Grit?"

"It was THIS BIG! I swear."
It is also referred to as "Rule of ... Fin."

Are Sharks Afraid of Their Own Image?

Episode 35 – "Border Slingshot" 
 Original air date: July 27, 2005
This was the first episode in which the entire hour was devoted to testing a single myth.

Episode 36 – "Killer Tissue Box" 
 Original air date: August 3, 2005

Killer Tissue Box

Splitting an Arrow 
The Build Team take on a myth stemming from the film The Adventures of Robin Hood, where the most famous stunt is one where an arrow was split in half, from nock to tip. The Build Team explores whether this was at all possible, and also challenges fans at a medieval fair to duplicate this feat. This myth was retested in "Splitting an Arrow".

Episode 37 – "Escape Slide Parachute" 
 Original air date: August 10, 2005

Escape Slide Parachute 
Inspired by a scene from Indiana Jones and the Temple of Doom where Indy (Harrison Ford), Willie Scott (Kate Capshaw) and Short Round (Ke Huy Quan) successfully evacuate a pilotless plane using a life raft.

Exploding Hair Cream

Episode 38 – "MythBusters Revisited" 
 Original air date: October 12, 2005
This episode is the second episode where the MythBusters team focus on retesting earlier myths, based on fan reaction (the first is Myths Revisited). Grant Imahara is also introduced in this episode.

Blown Away 2

Explosive Decompression

Who Gets Wetter?

Plywood Builder

Biscuit Bazooka Spinoff

AC vs. Windows Down

Car Capers – Exploding Gas Tank

Episode 39 – "Chinese Invasion Alarm" 
 Original air date: October 19, 2005

Chinese Invasion Alarm

Five-second Rule

Episode 40 – "Confederate Rocket" 
 Original air date: October 26, 2005
This was the second episode in which the entire hour was devoted to testing a single myth. Because the myth dealt with the making of explosive and or dangerous materials, the ingredients used to make nitrous oxide and gun cotton were censored by substituting animal sounds for the chemical names. This myth was revisited in "Salami Rocket".

Episode 41 – "Vodka Myths" 
 Original air date: November 2, 2005

Compact Compact

Vodka Myths I 

Vodka...

Episode 42 – "Steel Toe-Cap Amputation" 
 Original air date: November 9, 2005

Steel Toe-Cap Amputation

Bottle Rocket Blast-Off 
The Build team attempt to recreate this
water bottle jetpack from a Japanese game show.

Episode 43 – "Seasickness – Kill or Cure" 
 Original air date: November 16, 2005

Seasickness – Kill or Cure? 
Because Adam and Grant are very susceptible to motion sickness, they test non-pharmaceutical remedies for seasickness by...

Tailgate Up vs. Tailgate Down 
This was revisited in More Myths Revisited.

Finger in a Barrel 
The Build Team take on a myth that forms a staple of cartoon physics. This was revisited in Myths Redux.

References

External links 

 MythBusters Official site
 

2005 American television seasons
2005